Daggubati Venkatesh (born 13 December 1960) is an Indian actor known for his works predominantly in Telugu cinema, and few Hindi language films. Early in his career, Venkatesh starred in box-office hits such as the romance film Prema (1989), the action drama Bobbili Raja (1990), and the road movie Kshana Kshanam (1991) featured at the Fribourg Festival, which went on to gather a cult following. 

In a career spanning 37 years, Venkatesh fetched critical acclaim for his performances as a painter in Swarnakamalam (1988) featured in the Indian panorama section of the 12th IFFI, the Asia Pacific Film Festival and the Ann Arbor Film Festival; a coolie in Coolie No. 1 (1991), an eccentric cop in Surya IPS (1991) and Gharshana (2004), an autistic villager in the melodrama Chanti (1992), a journalist in the social problem film Ganesh (1998), an attorney in Sathruvu (1991) and Dharma Chakram (1996), a farmer in Narappa (2021), the romantic dramas Preminchukundam Raa (1997), Premante Idera (1998), Raja (1999), Kalisundam Raa (2000), Nuvvu Naaku Nachav (2001), Vasantam (2003), Malliswari (2004), and Aadavari Matalaku Arthale Verule (2007), the crime thrillers Drushyam (2014); and Drushyam 2 (2021).  He is starred in Hindi language works such as Anari (1993), Taqdeerwala (1995), and Rana Naidu (2023). 

Venkatesh received five state Nandi Awards for Best Actor, and six Filmfare Awards South in various categories. Venkatesh co-owns Suresh Productions; one of the largest film production companies in India, under which he acted in several films. He is also the mentor of the Telugu Warriors, representing Tollywood in the Celebrity Cricket League.

Early life 
Venkatesh was born on 13 December 1960 in a Telugu family to film producer and former Member of Parliament, D. Ramanaidu and Rajeshwari in Madras (present-day Chennai), India. He has an elder brother Suresh Babu, who runs Suresh Productions, and a younger sister Lakshmi.

Venkatesh did his schooling in Don Bosco, Egmore, Chennai and graduated in commerce from Loyola College, Chennai. He got his MBA from the Middlebury Institute of International Studies at Monterey, US. After his return to India, he wanted to get into film production but instead, became an Indian actor in Telugu cinema.

Career

1986–1989: Debut and early career 
Venkatesh first appeared as a child actor in the 1971 film Prema Nagar. His first film as a full-fledged lead was K. Raghavendra Rao-directed Kaliyuga Pandavulu (1986), alongside Khushbu Sundar which was a debut for both of them. The film won him a Nandi Special Jury Award.

1996–2012: Critical and Commercial success 
In 1996, he portrayed an honest lawyer in Dharma Chakram, which won him both Nandi Award and Filmfare Award South. Later that year, he played a husband struggling between two wives in E. V. V. Satyanarayana-directed comedy drama Intlo Illalu Vantintlo Priyuralu, which was also a successful venture. In Ganesh (1998), he played a person fighting against the ills in the Indian public healthcare system. The following year, Venkatesh starred in the romantic action film Preminchukundam Raa. The film, which was one of the first portrayals of factionalism in Rayalaseema region, was a big commercial success. His 1999 drama film Raja, where he plays a small time thief who is reformed by his love is also well received by the audience. Following this, he established himself as one of top actors in Telugu cinema.

In 2001, Venkatesh starred in the romantic comedy film Nuvvu Naaku Nachav which was a critical and commercial success. The success continued with Malliswari (2004), in his second collaboration with director K. Vijaya Bhaskar after Nuvvu Naaku Nachav. In the following years, Venkatesh appeared in several films, including Chintakayala Ravi (2008), Namo Venkatesa (2010) and Bodyguard (2012).

2013–present: Multi-starrers 

In 2013, Venkatesh co-starred alongside Mahesh Babu in the critically acclaimed drama film, Seethamma Vakitlo Sirimalle Chettu. The film was the first Telugu multi-starrer film in recent decades, after which Venkatesh went on to feature in other multi-starrer films such as Masala (2013), Gopala Gopala (2015) and F2: Fun and Frustration (2019).

Venkatesh's performance in Drushyam (2014) received several accolades from the critics. He portrayed a strict boxing coach in the Sudha Kongara-directed sports drama Guru in 2017.

Later in 2019, he starred in Venky Mama, alongside his nephew Naga Chaitanya. The film was a profitable venture, grossing more than  worldwide. In the same year, he dubbed in Telugu for the Genie, in Alladin. His 2021 film Narappa was released on Amazon Prime, which marked his first direct-to-OTT release. 
In 2022 the 2nd part of the Fun and Frustration Series was released called F3. He starred alongside Varun Tej in this comedy masterclass°. The film received good reviews from critics and proved to be a Family Movie immediately.

Endorsements 
 On 24 April 2010, he signed with Manappuram General Finance and Leasing Ltd as their brand ambassador for Andhra Pradesh.
  He opened Ramraj Cotton Company branch in Ameerpet as a brand ambassador for the company.

Personal life 
Venkatesh married Neeraja in 1985 and the couple has four children—three daughters and one son. His eldest daughter Aashritha married Vinayak Reddy, the grandson of R. Surender Reddy, the chairman of Hyderabad Race Club. Venkatesh's sister Lakshmi was married to actor Nagarjuna, and the couple has a son, Naga Chaitanya.

Awards and nominations

References

External links 

Living people
Telugu male actors
People from Prakasam district
Male actors from Chennai
Male actors in Telugu cinema
Indian male film actors
20th-century Indian male actors
21st-century Indian male actors
Filmfare Awards South winners
Nandi Award winners
Don Bosco schools alumni
Loyola College, Chennai alumni
Male actors from Andhra Pradesh
1960 births